Marc Tarpenning (born June 1, 1964) is an American engineer and technology entrepreneur who is the co-founder of Tesla Inc. with Martin Eberhard in 2003. Tarpenning served as the Chief Financial Officer (CFO) and Vice President of Engineering of Tesla.

Early life 
Marc Tarpenning was born in Sacramento, California, on June 1, 1964. He attended the University of California, Berkeley and obtained a B.A. degree in computer science in 1985.

Career 
After graduating from Berkeley, Tarpenning spent several years working for Textron in Saudi Arabia. Tarpenning then developed software and firmware products for several companies, including Seagate Technology and Bechtel, and later served as vice president of engineering at Packet Design, a network technology company. In 1997,  Tarpenning and Martin Eberhard founded NuvoMedia, a company that built an early e-book reader, the RocketBook, in 1998. In 2000, Gemstar–TV Guide International acquired NuvoMedia for $187 million.

In 2003, Tarpenning and Martin Eberhard collaborated again and founded Tesla Motors (now Tesla Inc.). The two co-founders funded the company until early 2004, when Elon Musk led the company's $6.5 million Series A financing round in February 2004 and became the chairman of the board. Tarpenning continued to serve as the Chief Financial Officer (CFO) and the Vice President of Electrical Engineering in Tesla until 2008.

After leaving Tesla, Tarpenning began to serve as an adviser or member of advisory board of several companies, including his alma mater (SkyDeck project, UC Berkeley) and Spero Ventures, a VC firm.

References 

1964 births
Living people
American chief executives in the automobile industry
Tesla, Inc. people
University of California, Berkeley alumni
People from Sacramento, California
American founders of automobile manufacturers
Automotive businesspeople